Chilbosan is a hill on the border of Suwon and Ansan , Hwaseong in Gyeonggi Province, South Korea. It stands 239 metres above sea level and 6 km from the Yellow Sea coast. A road from the south-east also runs up Chilbosan.

References

Hills of South Korea
Suwon
Landforms of Gyeonggi Province